In taxonomy, Desulfurococcus is a genus of the Desulfurococcaceae.

References

Further reading

Scientific journals

Scientific databases

External links

Type strain of Desulfurococcus mobilis at BacDive -  the Bacterial Diversity Metadatabase

Archaea genera
Formatotrophs
Thermoproteota